Mona Foma, stylised as MONA FOMA (an acronym for Museum of Old and New Art: Festival of Music and Art, often further shortened to MOFO) is an annual music and arts festival held in January in Tasmania, Australia, curated by Violent Femmes member Brian Ritchie. It is billed as Tasmania's largest contemporary music festival and showcases the work of artists in a broad range of art forms, including sound, noise, dance, theatre, visual art, performance and new media.

A wintertime version of the festival, Dark Mofo, is held annually in June. Its events are mainly shown at night-time.
Mona Foma was established in 2008 by the Museum of Old and New Art, Ritchie and the Salamanca Arts Centre. The first festival was held the following year and headlined by Nick Cave and the Bad Seeds. In 2010, Ritchie initiated EAR (Eminent Artist in Residence) program and John Cale became the festival's first EAR and the second festival headliner.

Other musical acts to appear at the festival include Swans, PJ Harvey, Philip Glass, Godspeed You! Black Emperor, Peaches, Gotye, Mike Patton and Laibach.

References

External links
Official website
2011 Review - Beat Magazine

2008 establishments in Australia
Arts festivals in Australia
Festivals in Tasmania
Music festivals in Australia